This list of tallest buildings in Rochester ranks high-rise buildings in the U.S. city of Rochester, New York by height. The tallest building in the city is the Xerox Tower, which rises  and was completed in 1968.

Tallest buildings
This includes spires and architectural details but does not include antenna masts. Existing structures are included for ranking purposes based on present height.

Tallest under construction, approved and proposed
This lists buildings that are under construction, approved for construction or proposed for construction in Rochester and are planned to rise at least , but are not yet completed structures. Under construction buildings that have already been topped out are also included.

The demolition of Midtown Plaza was completed in 2011. Paetec was bought by Windstream and they housed their regional offices in a renovated 3 story portion of the former Seneca Building, rather than build a new tower.

Timeline of tallest buildings

Notes
Cleveland, New Orleans, Tulsa and Tampa are tied, with 4 each. Source of Skyline ranking information: SkyscraperPage.com: New York, Chicago, Miami, Houston, Los Angeles, Dallas, Atlanta, San Francisco, Las Vegas, Boston, Seattle, Philadelphia, Pittsburgh, Jersey City, Minneapolis, Denver, Detroit, Charlotte, Columbus, Tulsa, Cleveland, New Orleans, and Tampa.

See also
List of tallest buildings in Upstate New York

References
 Emporis.com - Rochester

External links
 Diagram of Rochester skyscrapers on SkyscraperPage

Rochester, New York
Rochester